Clifford Frank Hawkins  (1915–1991) was a British gastroenterologist and rheumatologist.

Biography
After education at Dulwich College, Clifford F. Hawkins studied at the medical school of Guy's Hospital, where he graduated MB BS in 1939. During WWII he served briefly in the RAMC before being invalided out. He then served during the remainder of the war in the EMS. In 1946 he moved to Birmingham, where he was mentored by Lionel Hardy. At Queen Elizabeth Hospital Birmingham, he was from 1946 to 1950 a senior registrar and from 1950 to 1981 a consultant physician. From 1951 to 1981 he was a senior lecturer at the University of Birmingham. From 1955 he was also a consultant physician at Droitwich Hospital.

He received the Diploma of Anaesthesiology in 1942 and the higher MD in 1946. He was elected FRCP in 1955. He gave in 1970 the Bradshaw Lecture on Diarrhoea: changing concepts and new diagnoses.

In 1976 Hawkins and colleagues M. Farr, C. J. Morris, A. M. Hoare, and N. Williamson were the first to report rod-shaped organisms in synovial membrane involved in Whipple's disease.

He was outstanding in writing and lecturing. The BMJ editor Stephen Lock recommended Hawkins's book Speaking and writing in medicine for its excellence on the topic of "listening and speaking to patients" as well as its "commonsense, wit, and wisdom". Hawkins wrote books and articles for medical professionals and for the general public. For about 10 years for the British Medical Journal he wrote a monthly column entitled "What's new in the new editions".

Hawkins was the editor-in-chief for the Rheumatism and Arthritis Council's Reports on rheumatic diseases from 1959 to 1977. He was the president of the Heberden Society in 1982. (The Heberden Society was formed in 1936 and became in 1983 part of the British Society for Rheumatology.)

On 22 September 1945 at Seven Oaks Congregational Church in Kent, Hawkins married Susan Fantes. They had three children.

Selected publications

Articles
with L. P. J. Holt: 

with A. M. Hoare:

Books
two chapters in 
 https://www.science.org/doi/10.1126/science.159.3810.73.b 

as editor with R. N. Allan, Michael R. B. Keighley, and J. Alexander-Williams:  2nd edition, 1990.
as editor with Marco Sorgi: 
with Elwyn Elias:

References

1915 births
1991 deaths
British gastroenterologists
20th-century English medical doctors
People educated at Dulwich College
Academics of the University of Birmingham
Fellows of the Royal College of Physicians